U.S. Route 85 (US 85) is a  north–south United States Highway that travels in the Mountain and Northern Plains states of the United States. The southern terminus of the highway is at the Mexican border in El Paso, Texas, connecting with Mexican Federal Highway 45. The northern terminus is at the Canadian border in Fortuna, North Dakota, where the route continues north as Saskatchewan Highway 35. The highway route is part of the CanAm Highway. Sections of US 85 are designated as the Theodore Roosevelt Expressway.

Route description

|-
|TX
|21
|34
|-
|NM
|483
|777
|-
|CO
|310
|499
|-
|WY
|256
|412
|-
|SD
|154
|248
|-
|ND
|255
|410
|-
|Total
|1479
|2380
|}
The highway passes through Texas, New Mexico, Colorado, Wyoming, South Dakota, and North Dakota.  From Las Cruces, New Mexico to Fountain, Colorado, US-85 shares its alignment with I-25 and is not signed.

Texas

US 85 in Texas begins at the Mexico–US border with US 62 and travels north through El Paso, beginning at the Santa Fe Street Bridge, and following Santa Fe Street, then Paisano Drive westward, along the Rio Grande until Paisano Drive ends where it joins with Interstate 10, about  before both reach the New Mexico border. The route is concurrent with I-10 for the remainder of its route within Texas.

The original route of US 85 in Texas had the highway concurrent with Doniphan Drive (after Paisano Drive), and parallelling the Atchison, Topeka and Santa Fe Railway through the Mesilla Valley communities of Canutillo, Vinton and Anthony before crossing the Texas/New Mexico state line in Anthony, New Mexico, then following the road which is now New Mexico State Road 478 (NM 478) up the Mesilla Valley to Las Cruces. This route is marked as Texas State Highway 20 north of the intersection with Mesa Street/Country Club Drive.

New Mexico

The unsigned route of US 85 through New Mexico exists only on paper to maintain continuity with signed sections in Colorado and Texas.  Except for a 4-mile segment through Las Vegas (signed as Business Loop 25), US 85 in New Mexico is entirely concurrent with Interstate Routes. For the first  it shares its route with I-10, then continues north for the remainder of its length in New Mexico concurrent with I-25.  US-85 was de-signed in segments between 1970 and 1990 as I-25 was built through the state. I-25 between Bernalillo and a point just south of Santa Fe was built over the old US 85 alignment. I-25 was also built directly over US 85 from east of Santa Fe to Las Vegas and from US 64 to the Colorado border at Raton Pass. At one point, the route went along the historic El Camino Real.

The original route from Anthony to Las Cruces is now signed as NM 478. The original route from Las Cruces to Hatch is now signed as NM 185; NM 187 south of Truth or Consequences (T or C); NM 181 north of T or C; NM 1 (the route's pre-US-85 designation) from Redrock to Socorro; NM 314 from Belen to Albuquerque; NM 313 from Albuquerque to Bernalillo; NM 14 and NM 466 through Santa Fe; and NM 445 from Maxwell to US 64  Remnant US-85 signs can still be seen on Fourth Street in downtown Albuquerque, the original route through the city before I-25 was built.

For concurrencies of interstate, US routes, and routes of different levels of significance, the New Mexico Department of Transportation's policy is to sign only the route of greater significance, while leaving the route of lesser significance unsigned.  Consistent with this policy, NMDOT has removed US 85 from its route logs, but the American Association of State Highway and Transportation Officials (AASHTO) retains US 85 on a concurrent alignment with I-10 and I-25 to maintain continuity with signed segments in Texas and Colorado.

Colorado

US 85 enters Colorado from New Mexico concurrent with I-25 but is not signed.  US 85 leaves I-25 at Exit 128 and follows Santa Fe Avenue through Fountain before turning west briefly onto Lake Avenue, then turning north following Nevada Avenue through Colorado Springs before rejoining I-25 at Exit 148.  Approaching the south side of Denver, US 85 again leaves I-25 at Exit 184.  From there it heads west and north as a two lane rural highway.  It becomes an expressway near Chatfield Reservoir and the southern Denver suburbs of Littleton and Englewood, where it is commonly known as Santa Fe Drive. It continues north through Denver for a few miles before once again joining with I-25 at mile marker 207.  There it becomes a concurrency with US 87 as well as I-25 and heads north through downtown Denver.  At exit 214, US 85 turns east and becomes a concurrency with I-70 and US 6 for about a mile where it exits with U.S. 6 and heads northeast through Commerce City.  In just a few miles the US 6/US 85 concurrency merges with I-76 at mile marker 9.  They travel concurrently for  until exit 12 when US 85 becomes an expressway and continues north out of the Denver area through Brighton.  From there it parallels I-25 for about  passing through Fort Lupton, Platteville, LaSalle, Evans, Greeley, Eaton, Ault, Pierce, and Nunn before crossing into Wyoming.

Wyoming

In Cheyenne it joins with Business Route 87, and a mile later with I-180 until it meets with US 30. The segment with I-180 is the only fully at-grade interstate route in the U.S.  At exit 12, it joins with I-25 and US 87 in a concurrency for  until US 85 leaves at exit 17 and travels northeast towards Meriden. From there it heads north to Torrington, where it meets with US 26 and concurrencies for  until Lingle, and  later it meets US 20 and US 18 at Lusk. It shares the next  with US 18 and  later meets US 16 near Newcastle. From here it is  until it enters South Dakota in the Black Hills.

South Dakota
The South Dakota section of US 85, with the exception of two concurrencies with US 14 Alternate and a concurrency with I-90, is defined at South Dakota Codified Laws § 31-4-181.

US 85 enters the Black Hills from Wyoming and travels northeast until it meets with US 14 Alternate east at Cheyenne Crossing. The two routes form a concurrency from there, along the way coming to the road which leads to Terry Peak. Upon entering  to Lead, the two routes are separated, and the overlap with US 85 is replaced by a truck route. As the route US 85 and US 14 are separated until both meet again in Deadwood, but not before US 85 serves as the northern terminus of U.S. Route 385. The routes run together through Deadwood before splitting, and US 85 then runs north to meet I-90. US 85 overlaps I-90 for  while heading west.  At exit 10 on the north side of Spearfish, US 85 heads back north. At Belle Fourche it crosses state highway 34 and US 212.  From there it continues to North Dakota passing only through the small towns of Redig, Buffalo (where it meets state highway 20), and Ludlow, as well as coming to the Geographic Center of the United States.

North Dakota

US 85 enters North Dakota in the southwest part of the state. The first city on its route is Bowman at the junction of US 12. Continuing north, it passes between North Dakota's two highest points, White Butte and Black Butte. Near Belfield it junctions with I-94. After forming a concurrency with North Dakota Highway 200, it eventually passes through part of the scenic Badlands, crosses the Little Missouri River and passes near the Theodore Roosevelt National Park (North Unit).

Then, at Watford City it travels west for  where it turns back north before Alexander. U.S. 85 continues north as North Dakota 200 turns west toward Montana. South of Williston it crosses the Missouri River. The stretch from Watford City to Williston is in the process of being converted into an undivided four-lane highway, and should be substantially completed in 2014. After US 2 heads east, US 85 continues north to a concurrency with North Dakota Highway 5.

History
What is now US 85 from El Paso, Texas to then-US 66 (now NM 6) in Los Lunas, New Mexico (south of Albuquerque) was shown as U.S. Route 466 in an early 1925 plan for the U.S. Highway System. This north–south route was never signed in the field; instead, the route was designated as U.S. Route 570 and then as part of US 85. The number "466" was later used along another routing.

Major intersections
Texas
US 62/US 85 travels concurrently through the city.
  in El Paso. The highways travel concurrently to the Las Cruces–University Park, New Mexico line.
New Mexico
  on the Las Cruces–University Park line. I-25/US 85 shares a hidden concurrency to Fountain, Colorado.
  in Las Cruces
  west of San Antonio
  in Socorro. The highways travel concurrently to south-southwest of Abeytas.
  in Albuquerque
  in Bernalillo
  south of Santa Fe. US 84/US 85 travels concurrently to Romeroville. US 85/US 285 travels concurrently to Eldorado at Santa Fe.
  south of Raton. The highways travel concurrently to Raton.
  in Raton. US 85/US 87 travels concurrently to Fountain, Colorado.
Colorado
  in Trinidad. The highways travel concurrently to Walsenburg.
  in Pueblo. The highways travel concurrently through Pueblo.
  in Colorado Springs
  in Colorado Springs. The highways travel concurrently to Castle Rock.
  in Denver. The highways travel concurrently through Denver.
  in Denver. The highways travel concurrently to near Commerce City.
  in Denver
  in Denver. I-70/US 85 travels concurrently through Denver.
  in Commerce City
  in Henderson
  in Evans. The highways travel concurrently to Greeley.
Wyoming
  on the Fox Farm-College–Cheyenne line. I-180/US 85 travels concurrently into Cheyenne proper.
  in Cheyenne
  in Cheyenne. The highways travel concurrently to Ranchettes.
  in Torrington. The highways travel concurrently to Lingle.
  in Lusk. US 18/US 85 travels concurrently to the northeastern part of Niobrara County. US 20/US 85 travels concurrently through Lusk.
  in Newcastle
South Dakota
  in Deadwood
  in Spearfish. The highways travel concurrently to North Spearfish.
  in Belle Fourche
North Dakota
  in Bowman. The highways travel concurrently through Bowman.
  in Belfield
  west of Williston.
  on Williston city line. Southern end of US 2 concurrency. Northern terminus of US 85B. 
  About  North of Williston. Northern end of US 2 concurrency.
  at the Canada–US border north-northwest of Fortuna

See also
 Special routes of U.S. Route 85

References

External links

Endpoints of U.S. Highway 85

 
United States Numbered Highway System
U.S. Highways in South Dakota
U.S. Highways in Wyoming
U.S. Highways in New Mexico
Theodore Roosevelt Expressway